Futbolo klubas Panevėžys, commonly known as Panevėžys is a Lithuanian football team from the city of Panevėžys. The team was promoted to the Lithuanian A Lyga after the 2018 season, when became winners of 1 Lyga.

History
The city of Panevėžys has a long history of football in Lithuania. Until 2014, the city was represented by 7-time title winners FK Ekranas. However, FK Ekranas was unable to meet financial criteria to participate in 2015 season and lost eligibility to participate in the A Lyga. The club was declared bankrupt. To fill the void, FK Panevėžys was established at the beginning of 2015, right before the new season start. Remarkably, the club made its debut in the second tier, finishing its first season in the eighth place. In 2016, the club improved its performance and finished in the fifth position. In 2017, Panevėžys aimed to win the I Lyga and return a club from the city of Panevėžys to the A Lyga. However, the start of season was disastrous, which resulted in the resignation of the head coach Virginijus Liubšys. Eventually, the club finished 10th in the league table. The 2018 season was much more successful. With the new coach Alexandru Curteian, FK Panevėžys won the I Lyga achieving promotion to the A Lyga. In the 2019 A Lyga, they were in 5th position.

Kit manufacturers

The team kit is produced by Danish company Hummel. It is all-red with white details to reflect the colours of the FK Panevėžys.

Honours
Lithuanian Championship:
A Lyga
3rd place (1): 2022
Lithuanian Cup
Winners (1): 2020
Lithuanian Supercup
Winners (1): 2021

Participation in Lithuanian championships

European campaigns

As of match played 14 July 2022

Notes
 QR: Qualifying round

Panevėžys B
The 'B' team is currently playing in Lithuanian I Lyga.

Current squad

Staff

Coaches

References

External links 
 Official website

 
Football clubs in Panevėžys
Football clubs in Lithuania
2015 establishments in Lithuania
Association football clubs established in 2015